Dickkopf (DKK) is a family of proteins consisting of five members as of 2020. The most well-studied is Dickkopf-related protein 1 (DKK1). DKK proteins inhibit the Wnt signaling pathway coreceptors LRP5 and LRP6. They bind with high affinity as ligands to KREMEN1 and KREMEN2, which are transmembrane proteins. DKK proteins have important roles in the development of vertebrates.

Structure 
DKK proteins are glycoproteins consisting of 255–350 amino acids. DKK1, DKK2, and DKK4 have similar molecular weights, at 24–29 kDa (kilodaltons). DKK3 is heaviest, at 38 kDa. In addition to having similar weights, DKK1, -2, and -4 have high structural similarity, with two shared cysteine-rich domains. DKK3 differs from -1, -2, and -4 by the presence of a Soggy domain at its N-terminus.

Proteins
Four DKK proteins and one DKK-like protein occur in humans and other vertebrates, with five proteins in the family in total:

 DKK1
 DKK2
 DKK3
 DKK4
 DKKL1 (soggy-1, Cancer/testis antigen 34)

Human disease
DKK proteins are believed to be involved with several human diseases, including bone cancer and neurodegenerative disease. Evidence also indicates DKK1 and DKK3 are involved in the pathophysiology of the artery, where they could contribute to atherosclerosis.

References

Protein families